Garth School is an historic school building located on South Broadway Street in Georgetown, Kentucky. Built in 1925 as a high school, the building currently houses Garth Elementary School. The property was listed on the National Register of Historic Places on November 16, 1988.

It is a Collegiate Gothic-style  red brick building with stone trim.  It overlooks a  lawn with two terraces.

References

School buildings completed in 1925
Public elementary schools in Kentucky
Buildings and structures in Georgetown, Kentucky
Gothic Revival architecture in Kentucky
National Register of Historic Places in Scott County, Kentucky
Schools in Scott County, Kentucky
School buildings on the National Register of Historic Places in Kentucky
1925 establishments in Kentucky
Collegiate Gothic architecture in the United States
Individually listed contributing properties to historic districts on the National Register in Kentucky